Lead Us Not into Temptation is an album by David Byrne, released in 2003 for the movie Young Adam, a film directed by David MacKenzie.

Track listing
All songs written by David Byrne except where noted.

Personnel
Lisa Aferiat – violin
Caroline Barber – cello
Georgia Boyd – viola
Barry Burns – keyboards, piano, guitar, Hammond organ, Rhodes
David Byrne: vocals and guitar
Richard Colburn – percussion, Drum kit on "Speechless"
Donald Gillan – cello
Hung Drawn Quartet on "Haitian Fight Song"
Allon Beauvoisin: baritone saxophone
Stuart Brown: drums
Keith Edwards: alto saxophone
George Lyle: bass guitar
Raymond MacDonald: alto saxophone
Graeme Wilson: tenor saxophone
Robert Irvine – cello
Greg Lawson – violin
Una McGlone – bass guitar
Gregor Philp – samples
Johnny Quinn – drum kit, percussion on "Bastard", and tympani on "Inexorable"
Alasdair Roberts – hurdy-gurdy on "Sex on the Docks"
John Somerville – accordion
Fiona Stephen – violin
Malcolm Lindsay & David Byrne - string arrangements

Release history

References

External links
DavidByrne.com on Lead Us Not into Temptation

Albums produced by David Byrne
Film soundtracks
David Byrne soundtracks
2003 soundtrack albums
Thrill Jockey soundtracks